Dryopteris cognata, the large kidney fern, is a herbaceous plant, a member of the Dryopteridaceae family.

Distribution 
It is an endemic species to St. Helena.

Taxonomy 
It was named by Otto Kuntze, in Revis. Gen. Pl. 2: 812 in 1891.

References

External links 
 https://www.pteridoportal.org/portal/taxa/index.php?taxon=dryopteris%20cognata
 https://www.ncbi.nlm.nih.gov/Taxonomy/Browser/wwwtax.cgi?id=1972761
http://www.plantsystematics.org/imgs/robbin/r/Dryopteridaceae_Elaphoglossum_dimorphum_21925.html
https://www.readcube.com/articles/10.1007%2Fs00606-003-0116-9

cognata